Svadbas is a rock band from Croatia founded in 1994. They are notable for several hits and soundtracks for the movie Fine Dead Girls (2002). Their song "Treblebass" won a Porin award for Song of the Year in 2006. They have also been voted Best Croatian Newcomer.

Members
 Pavle Miholjević
 Jura Ferina
 Ljubica Gurdulić
 Bojan Gaćina
 Ana-Maria Ocvirk
 Marko Kalčić

Discography

Albums
 Svadbas (Dallas Records, 1997)
 Jug (Dan, Mrak, 2000)
 Sami (Alka Records, 2001)
 F.M.D. sessions (Menart, 2002)
 La La (DOP - Menart, 2005)
 Još (2012)

References

External links
Official Homepage

Croatian rock music groups
Musical groups established in 1994